Coombe Lane tram stop is a light rail stop in the London Borough of Croydon in the southern suburbs of London. It is located south of Addington Hills and serves Royal Russell School and the Ballards residential estate.

Services
Coombe Lane is served by tram services operated by Tramlink. The tram stop is served by trams every 7-8 minutes between New Addington and  via  and Centrale.

During the evenings on weekends, the service is reduced to a tram every 15 minutes.

Services are operated using Bombardier CR4000 and Stadler Variobahn Trams.

Connections 
The stop is served by London Buses routes 130 and 466 which provide connections to New Addington, Croydon Town Centre, Thornton Heath, Purley and Caterham.

Free interchange for journeys made within an hour is available between bus services and between buses and trams is available at Gravel Hill as part of Transport for London's Hopper Fare.

References

External links

Coombe Lane tram stop – Live departures and timetables at Transport for London

Tramlink stops in the London Borough of Croydon
Railway stations in Great Britain opened in 2000